"Leaving October" is a song recorded by American country music group Sons of the Desert.  It was released in January 1998 as the third single from the album Whatever Comes First.  The song reached #31 on the Billboard Hot Country Singles & Tracks chart.  The song was written by the band's lead singer Drew Womack, along with Tom Douglas.

Content
The song is a ballad about the narrator missing his wife, who died in October 1989. In the chorus, he sings of the pain of her memory, saying that "If I live in the past, there's no future / Looking forward to leaving October behind."

Critical reception
A review in Billboard was positive, praising the "heartache and resignation" in Womack's voice, while calling the song itself "extremely powerful". Brian Wahlert of Country Standard Time considered the song a standout in his review of the album.

Chart performance

References

1998 singles
1997 songs
Sons of the Desert (band) songs
Songs written by Tom Douglas (songwriter)
Song recordings produced by Doug Johnson (record producer)
Epic Records singles
Songs about death